One Exciting Adventure is a 1934 American comedy film directed by Ernst L. Frank and starring Binnie Barnes, Neil Hamilton and Paul Cavanagh. It is a remake of the 1933 German film What Women Dream.

Cast
 Binnie Barnes as Rena Sorel  
 Neil Hamilton as Walter Stone  
 Paul Cavanagh as Lavassor 
 Grant Mitchell as Fussli  
 Eugene Pallette as Kleinsilber  
 Ferdinand Gottschalk as Jeweler  
 Henry Kolker as Customer  
 Doris Lloyd as Customer  
 Dick Winslow as Boy  
 Edward Keane as Hotel manager  
 G. P. Huntley as Man  
 William Worthington as Man  
 Dorothy Christy as Woman with Earrings  
 Edward McWade as Grouchy Man  
 Bess Flowers as Woman 
 Ann Doran as Girl  
 Joan Woodbury as Girl
 Phyllis Brooks as Minor role

References

Bibliography 
 Goble, Alan. The Complete Index to Literary Sources in Film. Walter de Gruyter, 1999.

External links 
 

1934 films
1934 comedy films
American comedy films
Universal Pictures films
American remakes of German films
American black-and-white films
Films with screenplays by Franz Schulz
Films with screenplays by Billy Wilder
Films scored by Heinz Roemheld
1930s English-language films
1930s American films